The Treasure of a Byzantine Merchant is a 1966 Czechoslovak film directed by Ivo Novák and starring Josef Kemr.

References

External links
 

1966 films
Czechoslovak crime comedy films
1960s Czech-language films
Czech crime comedy films
1960s Czech films